The Great Western Railway steam locomotive no. 4965 Rood Ashton Hall is a 4-6-0 Hall class locomotive. It is preserved at Tyseley Locomotive Works. The engine operates in its Great Western Railway green livery, and performs regularly on the Shakespeare Express, operated by Vintage Trains, between Birmingham and Stratford-upon-Avon, as well as various excursions.

History 
This locomotive was previously identified as 4983 Albert Hall, having been rebuilt in 1962 using parts from both original engines Albert Hall and Rood Ashton Hall. Both locomotives had their numbers stamped onto their respective parts. The purchasing group of enthusiasts thought they were buying 4983 Albert Hall but after later restoration discovered some of the parts had been stamped 4965 and some 4983. Rood Ashton Hall now has plates and numbers on one side that say 4983 Albert Hall for enthusiasts to see once again but still hauls Rood Ashton Hall's original tender. Albert Hall's original tender was a large Collett tender, so the only incarnation of 4983 Albert Hall and tender is Hornby's tri-ang model.

In November 2008, Rood Ashton Hall was taken out of service for overhaul after hauling the Rood Ashton Hall Farewell train from Solihull to Didcot Parkway.

The engine's 10-year overhaul took just a few months due to an ongoing programme of maintenance work that had been previously carried out during periods of low main line activity. It returned to the mainline in October 2009 and completed its full ten-year operating certificate before being withdrawn again in September 2019 for a further overhaul, which it awaits. 

Right before being withdrawn in 2019, the engine was temporarily renamed Polar Star, and was used to pull the Polar Express Train Ride between Birmingham Moor Street and Tyseley, albeit having a headlamp mounted on the center of the smokebox door. With the 2020 Coronavirus Pandemic and the engine still being out of service awaiting overhaul, the 2020 Birmingham ride was canceled. 

The engine complete with tender can be seen in the final 30 seconds of the 1958 black and white film "The Key" starring William Holden and Sophia Loren as it pulls out backwards from the railway station. The old British Railways logo has been blacked out on the tender but the name plate "Rood Ashton Hall" is clearly visible.

References

External links
Vintage Trains

4965
Railway locomotives introduced in 1929
4965
Standard gauge steam locomotives of Great Britain
4-6-0 locomotives